Greenwich Public Schools is a school district located in Fairfield County, in Greenwich, Connecticut.  The district has boundaries that are coterminous with those of the town.  Approximately 8,840 students, grades K–12, attend the Greenwich Public Schools.

As of 2012, elementary schools had the same pattern of racial segregation as the town as a whole with Hispanic students concentrated in the two elementary schools in the southwestern corner of the district, New Lebanon and Hamilton Avenue. There is a Connecticut racial diversity law which requires that the percentage of students in an ethnic group in a school may not deviate by more than 25% from the average for the district. Thus, as of 2013, the district was out of compliance and was searching for solutions.

List of Schools

Greenwich High School (grades 9-12)
Middle Schools (grades 6-8)
 Central Middle School
 Eastern Middle School
 Western Middle School
Elementary Schools (grades K-5)
 Cos Cob 
 Glenville 
 The International School at Dundee 
 Julian Curtis
 New Lebanon 
 North Mianus 
 North Street
 Old Greenwich 
 Parkway 
 Hamilton Avenue 
 Riverside

Notes

External links

Greenwich Public Schools

Greenwich, Connecticut
Education in Fairfield County, Connecticut
Greenwich